Esefjorden is a fjord arm on the north side of the Sognefjord in the municipality of Sogndal in Vestland county, Norway. The village of Balestrand is located on the south side of the fjord, at the mouth. The village of Tjugum lies at the north side of the mouth of the fjord. At Dragsviki, just east of Tjugum, there are regular ferry connections to Hella in Sogndal Municipality and to Vangsnes in Vik Municipality. Tjugum Church is located on the shore of the Esefjorden, just east of Dragsviki. The Norwegian County Road 55 follows the shoreline of the fjord on both sides.

See also
 List of Norwegian fjords

References

Fjords of Vestland
Sogndal
Sognefjord